Rafael Miranda da Conceição or simply Rafael Miranda (born August 11, 1984), is a former Brazilian defensive midfielder.

Career
On 8 January 2010, Marítimo signed Brazilian midfielder from Atlético Mineiro until June 2013.

On 15 June 2016, he signed for Vitória Guimarães.

Honours
Atlético Mineiro
Brazilian Série B: 2006
Minas Gerais State League: 2007

References

External links
 Official website

1984 births
Living people
Brazilian footballers
Brazilian expatriate footballers
Campeonato Brasileiro Série A players
Campeonato Brasileiro Série B players
Clube Atlético Mineiro players
Club Athletico Paranaense players
Esporte Clube Bahia players
ABC Futebol Clube players
Associação Ferroviária de Esportes players
Primeira Liga players
C.S. Marítimo players
Vitória S.C. players
Brazilian expatriate sportspeople in Portugal
Expatriate footballers in Portugal
Association football midfielders
Footballers from Belo Horizonte